is a Japanese singer who debuted in 1985. She had great success in the next ten years with around thirty singles, fifteen original albums and various compilations. Kohiruimaki is the most well known in the West for the song Ai yo kienaide, the first opening theme song from the anime series City Hunter in 1987, and for the ending theme song for the OVA Gall Force in 1986.

Discography

Albums
Call My Name (1985/11/21)
No Problem (1986/7/21)
I'm Here (1987/4/1)
Hearts On Parade (1988/1/21)
SO REAL (1988/11/11)
TIME THE MOTION (1989/11/11)
DISTANCE (1990/10/10)
silent (1991/9/25)
FRONTIER (1992/9/10)
KOHHY 1 (1994/5/25)
KOHHY 2 (1995/2/8)
Anniversary Nights (1997/12/15) (album indépendant, réservé au fan club)
This Is My Love Song (1998/2/5) (reprises)
Kaleidoscope (1997/5/20)
LOVE solution (2001/12/20) (album indépendant, réservé au fan club)
Tree Diagram (2011/7/20)
KOHHY 3 (2016/11/10)
KOHHY 4 (2018/12/10)
KOHHY 5 (2019/1/10)

Live albums
TIME THE MOTION LIVE (1990/7/25)
silent fiction tour 1991 (1992/1/25)
FRONTIER LIVE '92 (1993/2/25)

Compilation albums
The Best (1989/12/15)
KOHHY'S SINGLES (1991/7/25)
Dreamin' '89-'92 (1992/3/25)
Ballade Collection (1993/3/25)
Keep on dreamin' remix (1995/2/25)
Black Kohhy Best '85-'89 (1995/7/1)
White Kohhy Best '89-'95 (1995/7/21)
STAR BOX EXTRA (2001/12/5)
THE LEGEND (2003/1/1)
Golden Best (ゴールデン☆ベスト) (2005/1/26)
Kohiruimaki Kahoru - 20th Anniversary Selection (2005/6/29）

Singles
NEVER SAY GOOD-BYE (1985.10.21) (Ponytail wa Furimukanai theme song)
 (1986.07.02)　(OVA Gall Force ending theme)
 (1986.12.21) (Theme Song from the Nippon TV Drama Kekkon Monogatari)
Hold On Me (1987.02.26) 
 (1987.05.10) (City Hunter opening theme song) 
I'm Here (1987.05.21)
COME ON (1987.09.21) 
On The Loose (1988.01.01)
 (1988.05.21)
TONIGHT (1988.10.21) 
TOGETHER (1988.11.21)
DREAMER (1989.09.25)
 (Live Version)(1990.02.01)
Twilight Avenue (1990.05.10)
LIKE A FACTORY (1990.11.10)
MOVING ACTION / CRAZY LOVER (1991.01.01) 
TIMES GO BY (1991.03.25) 
SMILE FOR ME (1992.04.25)
 (1992.08.25)
 (1992.10.25)
 (1994.01.25)
SUMMER FACTOR (1994.04.01) 
HELLO AGAIN (1994.05.10)
Step by Step (1994.11.22)
Ride On (1994.11.30) (Tokumitsu no TV Columbus ending theme)
Super Hero (1994.12.07)
Justify My Love (1995.01.01)
Respect (1995.07.21)
 (1996.05.27)
Oh My Friend (1996.09.02) 
Just as... I don't wanna fall in love again (1997.04.23)
What A Wonderful World (1998.01.21)
DANCING QUEEN (2000.08.30)
Blue Sky (2004.08.25)
 (2014.07.01)

Videos
Heart no Ballade in Budokan (ハートのパレード in 武道館) 
Heart no Ballade in Budokan 2 (ハートのパレード in 武道館 2) 
TIME THE MOTION LIVE 
silent fiction tour 1991 
KOHHY'S SINGLES VIDEO 
DREAMER

References

External links
 Kohhy Official Site
 Kahoru Kohiruimaki at disvogs.com

Living people
1967 births
Japanese women pop singers
Paisley Park Records artists
20th-century Japanese women singers
20th-century Japanese singers
21st-century Japanese women singers
21st-century Japanese singers